A praise sandwich, compliment sandwich or feedback sandwich is a rhetorical technique to deliver criticism in a way that it is accepted by the criticized person.

It is named after the metaphor of a sandwich since it has three parts:
 Praise of the addressee
 Expressing what the speaker dislikes about the person
 Further praise of the addressee

In spite of the speaker's intention, it can be rejected if the criticized person detects that the praises were insincere and just a vehicle for the criticism or if the person prefers straightforward communication. 
They could label it a shit sandwich.
It can also fail if the receiver just picks the praise and ignores the criticism.

Authors have discussed its effect and how to improve it.

See also

References

Rhetorical techniques
Metaphors referring to food and drink
Criticism
Evaluation methods